Northampton County is a county in the Commonwealth of Pennsylvania.  As of the 2020 census, the population was 312,951. Its county seat is Easton. The county was formed in 1752 from parts of Bucks County. Its namesake was the county of Northamptonshire in England, and the county seat of Easton was named for the country house Easton Neston in Northamptonshire.

Northampton County and Lehigh County to its west combine to form the eastern Pennsylvania region known as the Lehigh Valley, and both counties are included in the Philadelphia media market, the nation's fourth largest media market. Lehigh County, with a population of 374,557 of the 2020 U.S. census, is the more highly populated of the two counties. 

Northampton County is industrially oriented, producing cement and other industrial products. It was a center for global cement production with the world's then-largest cement producer Atlas Portland Cement Company operating in the county for nearly a century from 1895 until 1982. Bethlehem Steel, one of the world's largest manufacturers of steel throughout the 20th century, was located in the county prior to its dissolution in 2003.

The Lehigh River, a  tributary of the Delaware River, flows through Northampton County. The county borders Carbon County and the Poconos to the north, Lehigh County to the west, Bucks County, and the Delaware Valley to the south, and the Delaware River, which divides Pennsylvania and New Jersey, to the east.

Geography

The climate is humid continental (mostly Dfa with a little Dfb in higher northern areas) and the hardiness zones are 6b and 6a. Average monthly temperatures in downtown Bethlehem average from 29.1 °F in January to 74.1 °F in July, while in Wind Gap they average from 27.0 °F in January to 71.7 °F in July.

Adjacent counties
Monroe County (north)
Warren County, New Jersey (east)
Bucks County (south)
Lehigh County (west)
Carbon County (northwest)

National protected areas
 Delaware Water Gap National Recreation Area (part)
 Middle Delaware National Scenic River (part)

Demographics

As of the 2020 census, the county's population was 312,951, reflecting growth of 5.1% over 2010.As of the 2010 census, the county was 81.0% White Non-Hispanic, 5.0% Black or African American, 0.2% Native American or Alaskan Native, 2.4% Asian, 0.0% Native Hawaiian, 2.2% were two or more races, and 3.8% were some other race. 10.5% of the population were of Hispanic or Latino ancestry.

2020 Census

Government
Northampton is one of the seven counties in Pennsylvania which has adopted a home rule charter.  Voters elect an Executive, a nine-person Council, a Controller, and a District Attorney.  The Executive, Controller and District Attorney are elected at large by all voters in the County. Five members of the council are also elected at large. The other four members of the council are elected from single-member districts. This weighted structure of government favors the majority of voters, but it does allow for representation of minority groups, if they live within a compact voting district. The Row Officers are nominated by the county executive and approved by county council.

Elected officials
The following currently serve as elected officials in Northampton County government offices:

County Executive
Lamont McClure, Democrat
County Council

Democrats
Ronald R. Heckman
Lori Vargo Heffner
Kevin Lott
Kerry L. Myers
Tara M. Zrinski

Republicans
John Brown
John Cusick
Tom Giovanni
John Goffredo

Clerk of Courts
Leigh Ann Fisher, Democrat
County Controller
Richard Szulborski, Democrat
District Attorney
Terry Houck, Democrat
Prothonotary
Holly Ruggiero, Democrat
Register of Wills
Gina Gibbs, Democrat

Politics

|}

As of November 7, 2022 there were 225,050 registered voters in Northampton County
 Democratic: 99,453 (44.19%)
 Republican: 81,711 (36.31%)
 No affiliation: 32,461 (14.42%)
 Other parties: 11,425 (5.08%)

In recent decades, Northampton has been identified as one of Pennsylvania's "swing counties," with statewide winners carrying it in most cases; since 1952, it has gone to the statewide winner in the presidential election. All five statewide winners carried it in November 2004 and all four statewide Democratic candidates carried it in November 2008, with District Attorney John Morganelli doing well there despite losing statewide to incumbent Attorney General Tom Corbett. The Democratic Party has been dominant most of the time in county-level politics in recent decades. In 2014, John Brown bucked that trend when he became the only Republican in the 21st Century to be elected Northampton County executive, a harbinger of Donald Trump winning the county and the state at the presidential level in 2016. Lamont McClure retook the county executive position for the Democrats in 2018; Joe Biden won Northampton County and Pennsylvania in 2020.

Voting machine problems 
Municipal elections were held across Pennsylvania in November 2019, and results in Northampton County were plagued with problems caused by newly purchased machines, The ExpressVoteXL, sold by the manufacturer Election Systems & Software (ES&S) as a luxury one-stop voting system.  According to The New York Times and other publications, it was a few minutes after the polls closed on Election Day when panic began to spread through the Northampton county election offices. Vote totals in one judge’s race showed one candidate, Abe Kassis, a Democrat, had just 164 votes out of 55,000 ballots across more than 100 precincts. Some machines reported zero votes for him.

The voting system, used in numerous Pennsylvania jurisdictions, combines a touch screen with a paper ballot backup.  County officials determined the results by counting the paper ballots, which showed Mr. Kassis had won by 1,054 votes. Unofficial results were announced at 6AM on November 6. The election results were certified following a canvass and audit. No challenges to the election results were filed.

County executives

County council members
Lori Vargo Heffner, President, Democrat, at large
John A. Brown, Republican, at large
John P. Goffredo, Republican, at large
Ronald R. Heckman, Democrat, at large
Tara Zrinski, Democrat, at large
Kevin Lott, Democrat, district 1
Kerry Myers, Vice President, Democrat, district 2
John Cusick, Republican, district 3
Tom Giovanni, Republican, district 4

State representatives
Milou Mackenzie, Republican, 131st district
Steve Samuelson, Democrat, 135th district
Robert L. Freeman, Democrat, 136th district
Joe Emrick, Republican, 137th district
Ann Flood, Republican, 138th district
Zach Mako, Republican, 183rd district

State senators
Nick Miller, Democrat, 14th district
Lisa Boscola, Democrat, 18th district

United States House of Representatives
Susan Wild, Democrat, 7th district

United States Senate
 John Fetterman, Democrat
 Bob Casey, Democrat

Education

Colleges and universities
Lafayette College, Easton
Lehigh University, Bethlehem
Moravian University, Bethlehem
Northampton County Area Community College, Bethlehem Township
Respect Graduate School, Bethlehem

Public school districts

Bangor Area School District
Bangor Area High School, Bangor
Bethlehem Area School District
Freedom High School, Bethlehem Township
Liberty High School, Bethlehem
Catasauqua Area School District
Catasauqua High School, Northampton
Easton Area School District
Easton Area High School, Easton
Nazareth Area School District
Nazareth Area High School, Nazareth
Northampton Area School District
Northampton Area High School, Northampton
Pen Argyl Area School District
Pen Argyl Area High School, Pen Argyl
Saucon Valley School District
Saucon Valley High School, Hellertown
Wilson Area School District
Wilson Area High School, Easton

Public charter schools
Lehigh Valley Charter High School for the Arts, Bethlehem

Private high schools
Bethlehem Catholic High School, Bethlehem
Moravian Academy, Bethlehem
Notre Dame High School, Easton

Transportation

Air transportation

Bus transportation
Public bus service in Northampton County is available through the Lehigh and Northampton Transportation Authority, known as LANta.  A shuttle bus service, The Bethlehem Loop, also operates in Bethlehem. NJ Transit provides service from Easton's Centre Square to the Phillipsburg area.

Major highways

Telecommunications

Northampton County was once served only by the 215 area code from 1947 (when the North American Numbering Plan of the Bell System went into effect) until 1994. With the county's growing population, however, Northampton County was afforded area code 610 in 1994. Today, Northampton County is covered by 610 except for the Portland exchange which uses 570. An overlay area code, 484, was added to the 610 service area in 1999. A plan to introduce area code 835 as an additional overlay was rescinded in 2001.

Recreation
There are two Pennsylvania state parks in Northampton County:
Delaware Canal State Park follows the course of the old Delaware Canal along the Delaware River from Easton in Northampton County to Bristol in Bucks County.
Jacobsburg Environmental Education Center

Communities

Under Pennsylvania law, there are four types of incorporated municipalities: cities, boroughs, townships, and two towns. The following cities, boroughs and townships are located in Northampton County:

Cities
Bethlehem (partly in Lehigh County)
Easton (county seat)

Boroughs

Bangor
Bath
Chapman
East Bangor
Freemansburg
Glendon
Hellertown
Nazareth
North Catasauqua
Northampton
Pen Argyl
Portland
Roseto
Stockertown
Tatamy
Walnutport
West Easton
Wilson
Wind Gap

Townships

Allen
Bethlehem Township
Bushkill
East Allen
Forks
Hanover
Lehigh
Lower Mount Bethel
Lower Nazareth
Lower Saucon
Moore
Palmer
Plainfield
Upper Mount Bethel
Upper Nazareth
Washington
Williams

Census-designated places
Census-designated places are unincorporated communities designated by the U.S. Census Bureau for the purposes of compiling demographic data. They are not actual jurisdictions under Pennsylvania law.

Ackermanville
Belfast
Cherryville
Chestnut Hill
Eastlawn Gardens
Martins Creek
Middletown
Morgan Hill
Old Orchard
Palmer Heights
Raubsville

Other unincorporated places

Beersville
Berlinsville
Butztown
Chickentown
Christian Springs
Colesville
Danielsville
Emanuelsville
Flicksville
Franks Corner
Hanoverville
Hollo
Katellen
Klecknersville
Moorestown
Mount Bethel
Newburg
Schoenersville
Seidersville
Slateford
Treichlers
Wassergass
Zucksville

Population ranking
The population ranking of the following table is based on the 2010 census of Northampton County.

† county seat

Notable people

References

Further reading
 Frances S. Fox, Sweet Land of Liberty: The Ordeal of the American Revolution in Northampton County, Pennsylvania. University Park, PA: Pennsylvania State University Press, 2000.
 William J. Heller, History of Northampton County (Pennsylvania) and the Grand Valley of the Lehigh. In Three Volumes. New York: American Historical Society, 1920. Volume 1 | Volume 2 | Volume 3

External links

Official website
Northampton County news at Lehigh Valley Live
"Famous People from the Lehigh Valley," The Morning Call, August 18, 2006

 
1752 establishments in Pennsylvania
Lehigh Valley
Populated places established in 1752